David Spicer may refer to:
 Dave Spicer (born 1985), Canadian rugby player
 David Spicer (organist) (1946–2017), church musician and co-founder of Albert Schweitzer Organ Festival USA
 David Spicer (writer), writer of the BBC Radio series Double Income, No Kids Yet
 David Spicer, Australian journalist, profiler of Ivanhoe, New South Wales
 David Alan Spicer, creator of Sparcade, an Arcade emulator
 David Spicer, artist, featured in Goldwell Open Air Museum